WPSL (1590 kHz) is a commercial AM radio station, licensed to Port St. Lucie, Florida, and serving the Treasure Coast. It is owned by Port St. Lucie Broadcasters and broadcasts a talk radio format.

By day, WPSL is powered at 5,000 watts.  But to avoid interference with other stations on 1590 AM, it reduces power at night to 63 watts.  It uses a non-directional antenna.

History
WPSL's original construction permit was applied for on July 12, 1984.  It acquired the call sign WPSL.  It signed on the air on October 12, 1965.

It originally was a daytimer, broadcasting at 500 watts by day and going off the air at sunset.

References

External links

PSL
Port St. Lucie, Florida
Radio stations established in 1984
1984 establishments in Florida